Greblești is a commune in Strășeni District, Moldova. It is composed of two villages, Greblești and Mărtinești.

References

Communes of Strășeni District